Webb Nunataks is a group of nunataks 2 nautical miles (3.7 km) west of Madey Ridge in the Neptune Range, Pensacola Mountains. Mapped by United States Geological Survey (USGS) from surveys and U.S. Navy air photos, 1956–66. Named by Advisory Committee on Antarctic Names (US-ACAN) for Dalton Webb, electronics engineer with Raydist Corporation, a member of the Electronic Test Unit in the Pensacola Mountains, 1957–58.

References 

Nunataks of Queen Elizabeth Land